T. R. Robinson  was a horologist and an authority on turret clocks. He was a Fellow of the British Horological Institute (FBHI).

Robinson appeared as a castaway on the BBC Radio programme Desert Island Discs on 2 December 1963.

Published works

References 

Year of birth missing
Place of birth missing
Year of death missing
Place of death missing
English clockmakers